The Ministry of Finance (Pénzügyminisztérium) is the central fiscal ministry of the Hungarian government under the Minister of Finance. The building is located on József nádor square.

References

Government ministries of Hungary
Ministry of Finance (Hungary)
Hungarian Ministry of Finance